Grand Island is an island town in Erie County, New York, United States. As of the 2020 census, the town's population was 21,389 representing an increase of 5.00% from the 2010 census figure. The town's name derives from the French name La Grande Île, as Grand Island is the largest island in the Niagara River and third largest in New York state. The phrase La Grande Île appears on the town seal.

Grand Island has been home to the Attawandaron Nation and an acquisition of both French and English colonial pursuits. In 1945, Grand Island was part of a plan to make a new World Peace Capital on the international border between Southern Ontario, Canada, and Western New York. The plan proposed placing the United Nations headquarters on adjacent Navy Island (Ontario), which was considered an ideal location because it lay on the boundary between two peaceful countries. An artist's rendering of the World Peace Capital showed the property with bridges spanning both countries (between Grand Island in the United States and the Canadian mainland). The proposal was turned down in favor of the current U.N. headquarters in New York City.

The town of Grand Island is in the northwestern corner of Erie County, and on the Canada–US border, although there is no river crossing to Canada. It is northwest of Buffalo, south of Niagara Falls, and is traversed by Interstate 190 and New York State Route 324.

History

Period before the American Revolution
In the early historical period of the island, French explorers found members of the Neutral Nation of Native Americans, also known as the Attawandaron, living on the island. By 1651, the nearby Seneca Nation had chased off or killed the Neutrals, having also absorbed some of the survivors. The Seneca then used the island for hunting and fishing.

In 1764, as part of the Treaty of Cession after the French and Indian War, the island became part of the British colonies in North America.

Period after the American Revolution
In 1815, New York State purchased Grand Island and other small islands in the Niagara River from the Iroquois nation for $1,000 in hand, and annually, a perpetuity of $500 every June. The treaty was signed by Governor Daniel D. Tompkins, Peter B. Porter, Chief Red Jacket, Falling Boards, Twenty Canoes, Sharp Shins, Man Killer, and others. The Senecas reserved the right to hunt fish and fowl on the islands.

In 1824, in a precursor to modern Zionism, journalist and Utopian Mordecai Manuel Noah tried to found a "Jewish homeland on Grand Island." It would be called Ararat, after Mount Ararat, the Biblical resting place of Noah's Ark. However, the idea failed to attract Noah's fellow Jews, and it never got further than a ceremonial laying of a cornerstone. MacArthur Award-winning cartoonist Ben Katchor fictionalized Noah's scheme for Grand Island in his graphic novel The Jew of New York.

The town of Grand Island was organized in 1852 from part of the town of Tonawanda.

On August 25, 1993, the Seneca Nation commenced an action in the United States District Court for the Western District of New York to reclaim land that allegedly was taken from them without the approval of the United States. The Senecas argued the 1815 transaction with New York State violated the Trade and Intercourse Act of 1790, which stated that no Native American lands were to be sold without the federal government's consent. The Senecas sought the ejection of more than 2,000 property owners on the island. By decision and order dated June 21, 2002, the trial court held the subject lands were ceded to Great Britain in the 1764 treaties of peace and the subject lands were not owned by the Seneca at the time of the 1794 Treaty of Canandaigua. New York state's purchase of them in 1815 was intended to avoid conflict with the Senecas over land it already owned. This decision was appealed, and the United States Court of Appeals for the Second Circuit affirmed the trial court's decision on September 9, 2004. The Senecas then sought review of this decision by the Supreme Court of the United States, which was denied on June 5, 2006.

Geography

The town lies adjacent to the border between Canada and the United States. As there is no direct bridge or ferry connection from the island to Canada, there are no customs or immigration services. Paired bridges connect the south end of the island to the town of Tonawanda, and another pair of bridges connects the northern end to the city of Niagara Falls in Niagara County. The two sets of bridges carry Interstate 190, a branch of the New York State Thruway (Interstate 90). In addition, New York State Route 324 (Grand Island Boulevard) is conjoined with I-190 at the southern bridges and reaches its western terminus in the northern part of Grand Island.

Adjacent cities and towns
 Niagara Falls, Regional Municipality of Niagara, Ontario, Canada – west
 Fort Erie, Regional Niagara – southwest
 Town of Tonawanda, Erie County – southeast
 City of Tonawanda, Erie County - east
 City of North Tonawanda, Niagara County – east
 Town of Wheatfield, Niagara County – northeast
 City of Niagara Falls, Niagara County – northwest

Major highways
   Interstate 190 (Niagara Thruway), crosses the island from north to southeast by the way of the North and South Grand Island Bridges.
  New York State Route 324 (Grand Island Blvd.), east-west highway from its northwest terminus at I-190 southeast through the central part of town, joining I-190 as the route travels east (south) to the town of Tonawanda by the South Grand Island Bridge. (This was the route across town between the single-span bridges that opened in 1935 until I-190 and the second spans were constructed in the 1960s.)
Beaver Island Parkway (also referred to on maps as South Parkway), north-south parkway from I-190 to Beaver Island State Park. (NYS Reference Route 957B)
West River Parkway (now closed), former north-south parkway along the western edge of town that parallels the Niagara River. It runs from Beaver Island Parkway in the south, north to Park Road in Buckhorn Island State Park near I-190 and NY 324's northern terminus. The speed limit was 55 mph. (NYS Reference Route 957C). The West River Parkway was closed in the fall of 2017 and converted into a bike path and pedestrian trail in 2018.

Demographics

As of the census of 2000, there were 18,621 people, 6,898 households, and 5,221 families residing in the town. The population density was 653.1 people per square mile (252.2/km2). There were 7,355 housing units at an average density of 257.9 per square mile (99.6/km2). The town's racial makeup was 95.80% White, 3.17% African American, 0.25% Native American, 1.17% Asian, 0.01% Pacific Islander, 0.25% from other races, and 0.88% from two or more races. Hispanic or Latino of any race were 1.09% of the population.

There were 6,898 households, of which 35.8% had children under the age of 18 living with them, 64.8% were married couples living together, 7.7% had a female householder with no husband present, and 24.3% were non-families. 20.2% of all households were made up of individuals, and 7.9% had someone living alone who was 65 years of age or older. The average household size was 2.68 and the average family size was 3.13.

In the town, the population was spread out, with 26.7% under the age of 18, 6.5% from 18 to 24, 27.7% from 25 to 44, 27.7% from 45 to 64, and 11.3% who were 65 years of age or older. The median age was 39 years. For every 100 females, there were 97.4 males. For every 100 females age 18 and over, there were 94.4 males.

The town's median household income was $60,432, and the median family income was $70,521. Males had a median income of $48,457 versus $30,157 for females. The town's per capita income was $25,816. About 2.4% of families and 3.0% of the population were below the poverty line, including 3.3% of those under age 18 and 5.1% of those age 65 or over.

Communities and locations on Grand Island

Fairview Court – A hamlet on the southwest shore of the island.
Falconwood – A hamlet on the southeast shore of the town, named after the Falconwood Club.
Ferry Village – A hamlet on the border of Beaver Island State Park.
Grandyle Village – Neighborhood (and census-designated place) located near Beaver Island Parkway and the South Grand Island Bridge.
Hennepin Road – Road within Grandyle Village named after French explorer Louis Hennepin, who observed and described Niagara Falls in 1677.
North Grand Island Bridge – Bridge north to the city of Niagara Falls.
Oakfield – A location north of Beaver Island State Park.
Sandy Beach – A hamlet in the northeast shore of the island.
Sheenwater – A location on the west shore of the island.
Edgewater – A location on the northeast shore of the island.
Sour Springs Grove – A location by the shore in the southeast part of the town.
South Grand Island Bridge – Bridge southeast to Tonawanda, a suburb of Buffalo.

Points of interest
Beaver Island State Park – a state park located at the south end of the island. The park is fully developed for many recreational activities, including a golf course.
Buckhorn Island State Park – a state park at the north end of Grand Island, noted for its attempts to preserve the local environment.
Grand Island Nike Base – a town park and senior citizen center, originally a US Army missile site which was part of Project Nike from the mid-1950s through the mid-1960s.
Grand Island Rod and Gun Club – an outdoor rifle range, trap and skeet range, and archery range. There is also a small pond on the land for fishing.
Niagara Amusement Park & Splash World – 85-acre amusement park that opened in 1961.
River Lea Farmhouse – an 1849 Victorian farmhouse once owned by Grover Cleveland's uncle, who hired Cleveland to work on the farm, the future president's first job.
Spaulding-Sidway Boathouse – listed on the National Register of Historic Places in 1998.
Veterans Park – a park in the north part of the town, home to many local children's sporting events.
Woods Creek – a small stream that enters the Niagara River at Buckhorn Island Park.

Notable people

Jimmy Arias, retired tennis player
Carly Beth, singer-songwriter.
Dale Brown, best-selling military techno-thriller novelist, graduated from Grand Island High School 1974
Stacy Clark, singer/songwriter; graduated from Grand Island High School 1998
Grover Cleveland, 22nd and 24th U.S. president, owned a home at Beaver Island
Charles N. DeGlopper, World War II Medal of Honor recipient, born and raised on Grand Island
Carlin Hartman, men's assistant coach with the Oklahoma Sooners men's basketball program
Thom Hatch, award-winning author and historian
Brett Kern, NFL player for the Tennessee Titans
Mohamed Abdullahi Mohamed, current President of Somalia
Mordecai Manuel Noah, American playwright, diplomat, journalist, and utopian who tried to found a Jewish homeland on Grand Island
Larry Playfair, retired NHL player
Paul Schenck, Episcopal priest
Rob Schenck, evangelical minister
Bill Scherrer, retired Major League Baseball player
Marc Scibilia, singer/songwriter
Ramblin' Lou Schriver, country musician and radio broadcaster, retired owner of WXRL
Leonard F. Walentynowicz, former United States Assistant Secretary of State for Security and Consular Affairs

Schools on Grand Island

Public schools
Public schools are under the jurisdiction of the Grand Island Central School District.
Grand Island High School
Veronica E. Connor Middle School
William M. Kaegebein Elementary School
Huth Road Elementary School
Charlotte Sidway Elementary School

Parochial schools
 St. Stephen School

References

Further reading
Selig Adler & Thomas E. Connolly. From Ararat to Suburbia: the History of the Jewish Community of Buffalo (Philadelphia: the Jewish Publication Society of America, 1960, Library of Congress Number 60-15834).
Rob Roy Macleod. Cinderella Island (Grand Island, NY: Grand Island Chamber of Commerce, 1969)
Gerald Carpenter, June Justice Crawford. Grand Island (Images of America) (Arcadia Publishing, 2015)

External links
Town of Grand Island official website
Grand Island history
Historic Preservation on Grand Island

Islands of Erie County, New York
Buffalo–Niagara Falls metropolitan area
Towns in Erie County, New York
Islands of the Niagara River
River islands of New York (state)
Islands of New York (state)
1852 establishments in New York (state)